Marijampolė City, FA Suvalkija, Suvalkijos jaunimo futbolo klubo akademija (Sudovian Youth Football Academy) is a football club based in the city of Marijampolė, Lithuania.

In 2022 Marijampolė City merged with the second tier I Lyga club FK Šilas Kazlų Rūda. The merger kept Marijampolė City name.

History

 2018 - the club was founded as a football academy by the initiative of football enthusiasts, parents and businessmen. The club have set ambitious goals to become nationally and internationally renown academy.
 2019 - the club applied for the II Lyga license and was granted one. The club took fifth place in II Lyga Southern Zone. 
 2020 – obtained II Lyga license, but later abandoned plans to compete. The academy continued to work only with children and youth.

2022 season
At the beginning of 2022, Marijampolė City merged with I Lyga club FK Šilas (Futbolo klubas Šilas). FK Šilas have been having disputes over funding with Kazlų Rūda city council, and after the merger moved to Marijampolė. As Marijampolė City did not have a senior team at this time, the senior team was essentially FK Šilas, rebadged to Marijampolė City. The club applied to the Lithuanian Football Federation (LFF) with a request to change its name and logo, and the request was granted. New club name and logo came into use from the start of round 6 in the I Lyga and from the start of the first round in the Hegelmann LFF Cup.

Seasons

Current squad 

|-----
! colspan="9" bgcolor="#B0D3FB" align="left" |
|----- bgcolor="#DFEDFD"

|-----
! colspan="9" bgcolor="#B0D3FB" align="left" |
|----- bgcolor="#DFEDFD"

|-----
! colspan="9" bgcolor="#B0D3FB" align="left" |
|----- bgcolor="#DFEDFD"

References

External links
 mcity.lt
 lietuvosfutbolas.lt 

Football clubs in Lithuania
Sport in Marijampolė
Marijampolė